1790 Naval Air Squadron of the Fleet Air Arm of the Royal Navy was formed on 1 January 1945 at RNAS Burscough as a night fighter squadron. It was initially equipped with the Fairey Firefly I, replaced in May 1945 by the Firefly INF, which was fitted with a US-derived ASV radar. The squadron joined HMS Vindex on 24 June, bound for Australia, with the ship arriving at HMS Nabthorpe (the Mobile Naval Air Base at RAAF Station Schofields) 2 days before the war in the Far East ended. The squadron was disbanded on 3 June 1946 at Devonport.

References

1700 series Fleet Air Arm squadrons
Military units and formations established in 1945